Jean Baptiste Arthur Brillant  (15 March 1890 – 10 August 1918) was a Canadian recipient of the Victoria Cross, the highest and most prestigious award for gallantry in the face of the enemy that can be awarded to British and Commonwealth forces.

Background
Brillant was born on 15 March 1890 in Assemetquagan, Routhierville, Quebec, the son of Joseph Brillant, a railway maintenance worker, and Rose-de-Lima Raiche.

Brillant studied at the College of Saint Joseph in Memramcook, New Brunswick, and then at the Séminaire de Rimouski in 1904–5. He later worked as a telegraph operator for a railway.

World War I
Brillant volunteered for service with the 89th (Temiscouata and Rimouski) Regiment (from 1920 the Fusiliers du St-Laurent) and held the rank of lieutenant. In 1916, eager to join the Canadian Expeditionary Force, he declared 13 years' service with this unit. On 20 March 1916 Brillant left his job as a telegrapher. After about six months’ training in Valcartier, he embarked for England with the 189th on 27 September 1916; on disembarking at Liverpool on 6 October, he was assigned to the 69th Infantry Battalion. He left for France on 27 October and joined the 22e Battalion (Canadien Francais) at Bully-Grenay.
 
During the night of 27/28 May 1918, in the vicinity of Boiry-Becquerelle, Brillant was called to lead a group of volunteers to help silence an outpost defended by about 50 men. Troops charged the enemy position, cut through the barbed wire protecting it, and took it. He was injured in the attack, yet captured enemy soldiers who had "valuable information". Remaining in action that day despite his wounds, Brillant would be awarded the Military Cross on 16 September 1918.

He was awarded the VC for his actions on 8/9 August east of Meharicourt, France the first and second days of the Battle of Amiens. He died the next day on 10 August 1918.

VC citation

Grave
Brillant is buried at Villers-Bretonneux Military Cemetery, Fouilloy, France located 15 km (9 miles) east of Amiens. (Plot VIa, Row B, Grave 20). His gravestone bears the inscription: 
FILS DE JOSEPH BRILLANT
ENROLE VOLONTAIREMENT A RIMOUSKI, PROVINCE DE QUEBEC 
TOMBE GLORIEUSEMENT SUR LE SOL DE SES AIEUX 
BON SANG NE PEUT MENTIR. 
which (roughly) translates to:
SON OF JOSEPH BRILLANT
VOLUNTARILY ENLISTED IN RIMOUSKI, PROVINCE OF QUEBEC
FELL GLORIOUSLY ON THE SOIL OF HIS FOREFATHERS
GOOD BLOOD DOES NOT LIE (a French expression meaning that he bore the positive traits of his ancestors)

His medals are held at the Royal 22e Regiment Museum in Quebec City.

A monument to Jean Brillant was erected in 1970 in Montreal, located in the park which also bears his name.

References

Further reading 
Monuments to Courage (David Harvey, 1999)
The Register of the Victoria Cross (This England, 1997)

External links
 Jean Brilliant digitized service file
 Legion Magazine

Canadian World War I recipients of the Victoria Cross
Canadian recipients of the Military Cross
1890 births
1918 deaths
Canadian military personnel killed in World War I
Canadian Militia officers
Royal 22nd Regiment
Royal 22nd Regiment officers
Canadian Expeditionary Force officers
People from Gaspésie–Îles-de-la-Madeleine